Holger Pedersen may refer to:
 Holger Pedersen (linguist) (1867–1953), Danish linguist
 Holger Pedersen (astronomer) (born 1946), Danish astronomer, at the European Southern Observatory
 Holger Petersen (born 1949), Canadian radio personality